Common Nonsense: Glenn Beck and the Triumph of Ignorance is a 2010 book by investigative reporter Alexander Zaitchik. Released in June 2010, the book attempts to critically explain the life story and phenomenon of conservative host Glenn Beck.

Publication

In researching the book, Zaitchik moved to Tampa, Florida, where Beck began his radio career at 970 WFLA from 1999 to 2002. While there, Zaitchik spent one year compiling and reading all of Beck's material that he could find, which also included listening to four hours a day of his radio program for eight months. Moreover, Zaitchik interviewed Beck's former friends, coworkers and colleagues in order to detail his transformation from "schlock jock" to "conservative media baron", By combining examination of Beck's public statements and a look at public records, Zaitchik compiles "a tough critique of the host's history, philosophies and methods, aimed at separating fact from hyperbole." In an interview about the book, Zaitchik remarked that:

Content

Throughout the book, Zaitchik documents how Beck progressed from being "a competitive radio DJ who belittled a rival's wife over the telephone about her miscarriage," to a nationally known TV pundit accusing the president of being a Communist and black nationalist." In the end, Zaitchik renders Beck as "part opportunist, part entertainer" who he accuses of "assembling a team of supporters to create the books, video segments, rallies and radio shows that fuel his growing legend." The book also documents Beck's "prodigious talent for rubbing people the wrong way." According to Zaitchik, "It’s just a fascinating American story, regardless of politics," noting that Beck went from a Top 40 DJ to a national political figure in the span of only a decade.

"The Ghost of Cleon Skousen"

W. Cleon Skousen (1913–2006) was an American author, conservative, faith-based political theorist – as well as a prolific popularizer among Latter-day Saints of their theology. As Zaitchik tells it, "Beck basically incorporated elements of each of Skousen’s three incarnations: hysterical lying paranoid red-baiter, New World Order conspiracist, and finally Christian Constitutionalist. If you look at what Skousen and some of the other right-wing Mormons from the last century were saying, guys like Ezra Taft Benson, you realize that Beck has revived their crusades and updated their mission, almost note for note."

Common Nonsense features a chapter on Beck's influences from Skousen, whom Zaitchik argues is "Beck's favorite author and biggest influence," noting that Skousen authored four of the ten books on Beck's 9-12 Project required-reading list. Zaitchik has referred to the Skousen chapter as "the most important" and "the most interesting to research and write."

Critical reception
Chris Faraone in his review for The Boston Phoenix referred to Common Nonsense as an "impressive feat" resembling "a piñata stuffed with damning testaments to Beck's astoundingly flawed character" with "stories of (Beck's) savage hypocrisy on nearly every page." Faraone goes on to remark that:

The Anchorage Press deemed the book the "definitive Beck biography", while Joe Conason of Salon Magazine described the book as "gripping" and "thoroughly researched", Mark Schmitt in The American Prospect referred to the book as "superb", and applauded Zaitchik for showing how "Beck's blackboard schemes" display "the oceanic audacity of his self-serving ignorance." Creative Loafing described Zaitchik as "a talented and incisive wordsmith", supposing that "a book like Common Nonsense is intellectual defense against (Beck's) rantings that have made him a cult hero among the Tea-Party set." Henry Stern in Willamette Week opined that Zaitchik is an "engaging writer who takes down Beck with strong research and entertaining turns of phrase", while diagnosing Common Nonsense as "a useful corrective to the hagiography that Beck’s acolytes subscribe to." The Boston Globe depicted the book as "a scathing profile that follows the powerful pundit from a single-parent home in rural Washington state to conservative superstardom."

Beck fans reaction

After the release of Common Nonsense, Zaitchik states that he sustained a "barrage of email bombs from the Beck Nation." According to Zaitchik, most of it was "triggered by religious web sites" with angry people telling him to "Go back to Russia" (where he worked for a time as a journalist) or "Go to hell." After the incident Zaitchik remarked that he "came away knowing not to underestimate the power of Glenn Beck," describing him as a "fascinating character", comprising "a blend of P.T. Barnum, Jimmy Swaggart, Aimee Semple McPherson and the old tent revivalists."

References

Further reading by Zaitchik
 The Making of Glenn Beck: Part I for Salon magazine, September 21, 2009
 Glenn Beck Becomes Damaged Goods: Part II for Salon magazine, September 22, 2009
 Glenn Beck Rises Again: Part III for Salon magazine, September 23, 2009
 Glenn Beck’s Manhattan of the Mind for The New York Observer, June 8, 2010

Adapted excerpts from Common Nonsense
 Brother Beck Presents: Glenn Beck’s Mormon Masterpiece Theater
 Past is Prologue: Glenn Beck's 'Rally for America' Redux
 The Crying Conservative: How Glenn Beck Taught His Feminine Side To Turn Tricks

External links
 Official site
 Interview: Alexander Zaitchik on his new Biography of Glenn Beck, Common Nonsense by The Washington Post
 Glenn Beck's Common Nonsense: An Interview With Alex Zaitchik by Campaign for America's Future
 Book Review: Alexander Zaitchik's Common Nonsense by Susan Gardner, DailyKos
 Review of Common Nonsense: Glenn Beck And The Triumph Of Ignorance by News Corpse

Video
 Zaitchik on Common Nonsense: Glenn Beck and the Triumph of Ignorance – interview by Democracy Now!

2010 non-fiction books
American non-fiction books
American political books
Books about politics of the United States
Books about media bias
Blaze Media